Danone North America is a consumer packaged food and beverage company based in White Plains, New York, U.S., that manufactures, markets, distributes, and sells branded premium dairy products (including yogurt), plant-based foods and beverages, coffee creamers, and organic produce throughout North America and Europe.

WhiteWave was purchased by French conglomerate Danone in 2017 for $12.5 billion, being then renamed to "DanoneWave".

History 
The company was established as "WhiteWave Foods" in 1977 by Steve Demos in Boulder, Colorado, to expand soy into the market.

The company was formerly a subsidiary of Dean Foods, and was spun off in an initial public offering announced in August 2012. Dean Foods had acquired WhiteWave in May 2002.

WhiteWave acquired Earthbound Farm, America's largest grower of organic produce, on January 2, 2014, for about $600 million.

In September 2014, WhiteWave announced they were taking over vegan dessert and beverage company, So Delicious. WhiteWave announced on October 31, 2014, that the So Delicious takeover was complete.

On July 7, 2016, French food and beverage manufacturer Danone announced a $12.5 billion deal to acquire WhiteWave. On August 15, WhiteWave announced a meeting had been scheduled for October 4 for stockholders to vote on the Danone takeover. The WhiteWave board unanimously recommend that the takeover bid be accepted. On March 31, 2017, Danone announced it had reached an agreement with the US Department of Justice concerning its WhiteWave transaction for $12.5 billion, wherein Danone sold its "Stonyfield dairy subsidiary in the months after the WhiteWave acquisition closes." The acquisition was completed in April 2017 and newly formed company was named "DanoneWave" and in April 2018 it was renamed "Danone North America".
It now operates as a subsidiary and the headquarters remains in Denver.

Brands 
The company’s brands distributed in North America include Horizon Organic dairy and pantry products, Silk plant-based foods and beverages, Left Field Farms creamer and milk, Stok cold-brew coffee, So Delicious nut milk and yogurt, and International Delight and Land O'Lakes coffee creamers and beverages. WhiteWave’s European brands of plant-based foods and beverages include Alpro and Provamel.

See also

List of food companies

References

External links
 
 
 

Groupe Danone
Food and drink companies of the United States
Food and drink companies based in Colorado
Companies based in Broomfield, Colorado
1977 establishments in Colorado
Food and drink companies established in 1977
2012 initial public offerings
2017 mergers and acquisitions
American subsidiaries of foreign companies
Certified B Corporations in the Food & Beverage Industry
Corporate spin-offs
Companies formerly listed on the New York Stock Exchange
Soy products